Kue pancong (in Indonesian and Betawi), kue pancung (in Sumatran Malay), bandros (in Sundanese), gandos (in Javanese), or buroncong (in Makassarese) is an Indonesian kue or traditional snack made of a rice flour and coconut-based batter and cooked in a special mold pan. It is a commonly found snack in Indonesian traditional markets. Kue pancong is usually associated with Betawi cuisine of Jakarta, while bandros is often associated with Sundanese cuisine of Bandung city, and buroncong with Makassarese cuisine of Makassar, although all refer to the same coconut hot cake.

The mold pan is similar to muffin tin but has rectangular basins instead of rounded. It took form of a row of rectangular basins of small tubs with a rounded half-moon bottom, thus create a half-moon or boat-shaped hot cakes. Pancong mold is quite similar to waffle mold. The special grill-like metal mold used in making kue pancong is also used in other Indonesian traditional kue; including kue pukis and kue rangi, thus the shape is quite similar to those cakes. Kue pancong is often regarded as the coconut version of wheat-based kue pukis.

Ingredients and cooking method

The batter is made from the mixture of rice flour, grated ripe coconut, granulated crystal sugar, salt, coconut milk, pandan leaves (optional for aroma), water, vegetable oil or margarine to grease the mold pan. Granules of crystal sugar were sprinkled as the topping.

Summary table
Kue pancong,  kue pukis and kue rangi are quite similar, this was mainly owed to the similar mold pan being used, thus the three hot cakes are often mistakenly identified. The general differences between those three hot cakes are as follows:

See also 

 Kue cubit
 Kue putu
 Serabi
 Kue ape
 Dorayaki

References

External links

 Kue pancong recipe
 Kue pancong video  — Youtube

Kue
Foods containing coconut
Street food in Indonesia